Bernadette Andrea is a professor in the Department of English at the University of California, Santa Barbara. She is also a core faculty in the Center for Middle East Studies, an affiliate faculty in the Comparative Literature Program, and an affiliate faculty in the Department of Feminist Studies. She previously taught at the University of Texas, San Antonio, where she was the Celia Jacobs Endowed Professor in British Literature. She received her PhD from Cornell University.  Her book on Women and Islam in Early Modern English Literature was published by Cambridge University Press in 2007 (paperback reprint 2009). Other books include Travel and Travail: Early Modern Women, English Drama, and the Wider World, with Patricia Akhimie (University of Nebraska Press, 2019), The Lives of Girls and Women from the Islamic World in Early Modern British Literature and Culture (University of Toronto Press, 2017), English Women Staging Islam, 1696–1707 (University of Toronto, Centre for Reformation and Renaissance Studies, 2012), and Early Modern England and Islamic Worlds, with Linda McJannet (Palgrave Macmillan, 2011).

References

Year of birth missing (living people)
Living people
Cornell University alumni
University of Texas at San Antonio faculty
American academics of English literature
University of Calgary alumni
Middle Eastern studies scholars